Sir Edward Mellanby  (8 April 1884 – 30 January 1955) was a British biochemist and nutritionist who discovered vitamin D and its role in preventing rickets in 1919.

Education
Mellanby was born in West Hartlepool, the son of a shipyard owner, and educated at Barnard Castle School and Emmanuel College, Cambridge, where he studied physiology.

Career
After working as a research student from 1905 to 1907, Mellanby studied medicine at St. Thomas's Hospital in London, and in 1913 became a medical doctor.  He served as a lecturer at King's College for Women in London from 1913 to 1920, during which time he was asked to investigate the cause of rickets. He discovered that feeding caged dogs on a diet of porridge induced rickets, which could then be cured with cod liver oil and concluded that rickets was caused by a dietary factor. It was later discovered that the actual cause of rickets is lack of vitamin D due to lack of sunlight which can be prevented or remedied by ingesting food rich in vitamin D, such as cod liver oil.

He worked on the detrimental effect of foods containing significant phytic acid, particularly cereals.

In 1914 he married May Tweedy, a lecturer at Bedford College (London) who would also carry out research into nutrition and dental disease.

In 1920 he was appointed professor of pharmacology at the University of Sheffield, and consultant physician at the Royal Infirmary in that city. He then served as the secretary of the Medical Research Council from 1933 to 1949.

He was elected a Fellow of the Royal Society in 1925. He was awarded their Royal Medal in 1932 and their Buchanan Medal in 1947.

In 1932, Mellanby was awarded the Cameron Prize for Therapeutics of the University of Edinburgh. He delivered the Croonian Lecture to the Royal College of Physicians in 1933 and the Croonian lecture to the Royal Society in 1943, both on the subject of diet.

He was knighted (KCB) in 1937 and made GBE in 1948.

Selected publications

Publications include Nutrition and Disease – the Interaction of Clinical and Experimental Work (Edinburgh and London: Oliver and Boyd, 1934). In the work, he writes extensively on vitamin deficiency. He delivered the Harveian Oration to the Royal College of Physicians in 1938.

Experimental Rickets (1925)
The Fat-Soluble Vitamins (1933)
A Story of Nutritional Research (1950)
The Chemical Manipulation of Food (1951)

References

1884 births
1955 deaths
Academics of the University of Sheffield
Alumni of Emmanuel College, Cambridge
British biochemists
British nutritionists
Diet food advocates
Fellows of the Royal College of Physicians
Fellows of the Royal Society
Fullerian Professors of Physiology
Knights Commander of the Order of the Bath
Knights Grand Cross of the Order of the British Empire
People educated at Barnard Castle School
People from West Hartlepool
Royal Medal winners
Vitamin researchers